Animal Actors on Location (formerly known as Animal Planet Live and additional names) is a live stage show at Universal Studios Florida, and formerly at Universal Studios Hollywood and Universal Studios Japan. The show features multiple animals performing stunts and tricks.

Summary 
The attraction is a live show featuring dogs, cats, birds, pigs, and other animals performing tricks onstage in a covered outdoor theatre. This show also integrates video segments and comedy from the human trainers. One of the trainers acts as the show's main host, explaining how the animals are conditioned to perform the tricks. Several of the animals are veteran actors of TV and film productions, many who were rescued from shelters. The show makes use of audience volunteers, primarily children, during several of its training segments. After the show, guests are invited to meet and pet some of the animals. The show's rotation of animals has varied throughout the years, including otters, horses, orangutans, and skunks.

Animal performers that have appeared throughout the attraction's run have starred as:

 Babe
 Beethoven
 Marley in Marley & Me
 Max in The Grinch
 Frank the Pug in Men In Black
 Additional animals in Evan Almighty, Night at the Museum, Meet the Parents, and Ace Ventura: Pet Detective.

History 

The attraction opened in Hollywood as "Animal Actors School Stage" in 1970, in Florida as "Animal Actors Stage" in 1990, and in Japan as "Animal Actors Stage" in 2001. Both US versions of the attraction received an Animal Planet-sponsored theming from 2001 to 2006. 

The Japanese iteration of the attraction was rethemed to "Toto & Friends", as part of the Land of Oz area in 2006, until being closed for the construction of the Universal Wonderland area in 2011. The Hollywood incarnation of the attraction, known as "Universal's Animal Actors," closed on January 8, 2023 and will be replaced by what is rumored to be a Fast & the Furious-themed rollercoaster.

References 

Universal Studios Florida
Former Universal Studios Hollywood attractions
Universal Parks & Resorts attractions by name
Amusement rides introduced in 2001
Amusement rides introduced in 1970
Amusement rides that closed in 2023
2001 establishments in Florida
2001 establishments in California
2006 disestablishments in Florida
2007 disestablishments in California